Lunardini is an Italian surname. Notable people with the surname include:

Cecilia Lunardini, Italian astrophysicist
Francesco Lunardini (born 1984), Italian footballer

See also
Lunardi

Italian-language surnames